Diptilon flavipalpis is a moth of the subfamily Arctiinae. It was described by George Hampson in 1911. It is found in Argentina.

The wingspan is about 24 mm. The forewings are hyaline (glass like) with black veins and margins. The hindwings are black, with the fold
and tuft white.

References

Euchromiina
Moths described in 1911